Aimé Casimir Marie Picquet, chevalier du Boisguy, sometimes spelt Bois-Guy, (15 March 1776 – 25 October 1839), was a Breton chouan general during the French Revolution. He was nicknamed "the little general" by his men due to his youth. Still a child at the outbreak of the Revolution, he signalled his precocity to fight on the Royalist side, joining the Breton Association at 15 and becoming aide de camp to La Rouërie. At 17 he was made leader of the chouannerie in the pays de Fougères, and a general at 19. Boisguy made the north-east of the Ille-et-Vilaine one of the most active areas of the Breton chouannerie, and showed himself an excellent tactician. Rarely beaten, the chouans there were among the best organised and best disciplined.  Fighting in uniform from the end of 1795 and made up of elite troops, even so they suffered from a lack of cavalry and a near-total lack of artillery. The Republicans had to raise major forces to defeat them, and then only with difficulty. In both 1796 and 1800, Boisguy was the last general to surrender, making him one of the main figures of the chouannerie.

1776 births
1839 deaths
People from Fougères
French counter-revolutionaries
Royalist insurgents during the French Revolution
Burials at Picpus Cemetery